Jilali ben Driss al-Youssefi al-Zerhouni (c. 1860 – 1909), commonly known as El Rogui, El Roghi or Bou Hmara, was a pretender to the throne of Morocco in the period 1902–1909, during the reign of Abdelaziz and Abd al-Hafid.

Name 
His name Jilali ben Driss Zirhouni al-Youssefi indicates his birthplace: Ouled Youssef in the Zerhoun area near Fes.

He was known as El Rogui ( ar-ruqī) meaning "the pretender" and Bou Hmara—also spelled Bu Himara, Bou Hamara, or Bouhmara—meaning the man on a female donkey.

Biography 
He originally held the position of secretary to Moulay Omar, brother of Sultan Moulay Abdelaziz, but after some intrigues at the royal court was imprisoned. After release, he went to Algeria, whence he returned (riding a female donkey) to Taza in the northeast of Morocco with the idea of impersonating Moulay Mohammed, another brother of the Sultan. Moulay Mohammed was venerated by the Moroccan public as a saintly figure, but although still alive and well, he kept to the royal palace in Fes and was almost never seen in public. Under this assumed identity, Bou Hamara proclaimed himself Sultan of Morocco. This was at the end of 1902, when he was about 40 years old.

He is said to have ruled ruthlessly in Taza and the surrounding area of the Rif and Nekor. He persecuted the Jews, who had to take refuge in neighbouring areas. He is said to have executed some of his opponents by soaking the victims in petrol, then setting them alight at night.

While ensconced in Taza, he was able to repel all attempts by the Sultan's army to invade his domain. However, by 1909, he had enlarged his area of control, and could not retain the loyalty of all the many different tribes it encompassed. In addition, he had alienated some of these tribes by selling mining concessions to Spanish interests.

By then the Sultan was Moulay Abdelhafid, a more vigorous ruler than Abdelaziz. Abdelhafid first attempted to discredit Bou Hamara by taking the real Moulay Mohammed, who was up until now imprisoned by the Sultan Abdelaziz, to a public mosque; but this caused a near riot and was not repeated. Fearing that Bou Hamara was expanding towards Fes, Abdelhafid sent another army against him, armed with cannon manned by French artillery instructors. During the resulting battle, the cannon were used to shell a religious shrine where Bou Hamara had taken refuge, and he was captured.

Bou Hamara's men were either decapitated on the spot, or taken hostage. It is said that 400 prisoners began the march to Fes but only 160 arrived, the remainder having been ransomed. Once at Fes, one-fifth of the captives were punished at a public mutilation, a hand and opposing foot being cut off (hirabah), and the others imprisoned.

Bou Hamara himself was for some time kept imprisoned in a small cage in which he could not stand. There are conflicting stories about how he was eventually executed. The most popular has it that he was thrown to the lions in the Sultan's menagerie, then shot when they proved too slow to kill him. Another account says that, too weak to hold himself upright, he was propped up in a metal tub normally used for the lions' feed, allowed to recite the shahada, then immediately shot in the head with a pistol. In both accounts, the body was later burned with a mixture of wood and the curtains from the Sultan's harem.

Notes

References
Dunn, Ross E. "Bu Himara's European Connexion: The Commercial Relations of a Moroccan Warlord", The Journal of African History, Vol. 21, No. 2 (1980), pp. 235–253
Dunn, Ross E. "The Bu Himara Rebellion in Northeast Morocco: Phase I", Middle Eastern Studies, Vol. 17, No. 1 (1981), pp. 31–48.
Le Glay, Maurice. La Mort du Rogui. Berger-Levrault, Paris (consulted 7th edition, 1926).
Maxwell, Gavin. Lords of the Atlas. (A modern classic, various editions).

20th-century Moroccan people
1860 births
1909 deaths
Pretenders to the throne of Morocco
People from Ouled Youssef
Moroccan rebels
People from Fez, Morocco
Antisemitism in Morocco
People executed by Morocco